Lake Spaulding Dam (National ID # CA00358) is a dam in Nevada County, California.

Owned and operated by Pacific Gas & Electric for hydroelectric power generation, the -high dam was designed by John R. Freeman and completed in 1913 .

It impounds the South Fork of the Yuba River, which originates near Donner Pass.  At the time of construction it was the highest dam in California, and one of ten PG&E hydroelectric facilities.  A temporary camp called Camp Spaulding, California was established to house workers on the dam during its construction.

See also 

 List of dams and reservoirs in California
 List of lakes in California

References

External links 

 "Souvenir of a Visit to the Lake Spaulding–Drum Power Development in the Sierra Nevada Region of California", full text available online via Google Books

Arch dams
Buildings and structures in Nevada County, California
Dams completed in 1913
Energy infrastructure completed in 1913
Dams in California
Hydroelectric power plants in California
Pacific Gas and Electric Company dams
Spaulding
Dams in the Feather River basin
Spaulding
1913 establishments in California
Spaulding